Sabelo Phumlani Nyembe (born 24 December 1991) is a South African soccer player who plays as a midfielder for South African Premier Division side Highlands Park.

References

Living people
1991 births
South African soccer players
South African Premier Division players
Witbank Spurs F.C. players
Highlands Park F.C. players
National First Division players
Association football midfielders